The following is a list of television plays broadcast on Australian broadcaster ATN-7 during the 1950s and 1960s.
The House on the Corner (1957) - TV series
Autumn Affair (1958) - TV series
The Big Day - episode of Shell Presents
No Picnic Tomorrow - episode of Shell Presents
Man in a Blue Vase - episode of Shell Presents
Johnny Belinda (1959) - episode of Shell Presents
Children of the Sun (1959) - episode of Shell Presents
Other People's Houses (1959) - episode of Shell Presents
A Tongue of Silver (1959) - episode of Shell Presents
Pardon Miss Westcott (1959) - episode of Shell Presents
Big Blue and Beautiful (1960) - episode of Shell Presents
Reflections in Dark Glasses (1960) - episode of Shell Presents
Thunder of Silence (1960) - episode of Shell Presents
Tragedy in a Temporary Town (1960) - episode of Shell Presents
Shadow of a Pale Horse (1960) (TV movie)
The Grey Nurse Said Nothing (1960) (TV movie)
Thunder of Sycamore Street (1960) (TV movie)
The Concert (1961) (TV movie)
The Story of Peter Grey (1961) TV series
You Can't See Round Corners (1967) (TV series)

References

See also
List of live television plays broadcast on Australian Broadcasting Corporation (1950s)
List of television plays broadcast on GTV-9

Plays
Plays
ATN-7